Khosrowshah District is in Tabriz County, East Azerbaijan province, Iran. At the 2006 National Census, its population was 36,002 in 9,276 households. The following census in 2011 counted 38,226 people in 11,279 households. At the latest census in 2016, the district had 48,663 inhabitants in 15,054 households.

The district got its name from Khusrau Shah, king of the Justanids during the 10th century. The words "Khosrow" and "Shah" are both Persian words that mean "king."

References 

Tabriz County

Districts of East Azerbaijan Province

Populated places in East Azerbaijan Province

Populated places in Tabriz County